The Minister of State at the Department of Enterprise, Trade and Employment is a junior ministerial post in the Department of Enterprise, Trade and Employment of the Government of Ireland and assists the Minister for Enterprise, Trade and Employment. A Minister of State does not hold cabinet rank.

There are currently two Ministers of State:
Dara Calleary, TD – Minister of State with responsibility for Trade Promotion, Digital and Company Regulation
Neale Richmond, TD – Minister of State with responsibility for Employment Affairs and Retail Businesses

List of Parliamentary Secretaries

List of Ministers of State

References

Employment and Small Business
Economy of the Republic of Ireland
Department of Enterprise, Trade and Employment